The Pergamon Bridge is a Roman substruction bridge over the Selinus river (modern Bergama Çayı) in the ancient city of Pergamon (today Bergama), modern-day Turkey. The two intact tubes, which consist of supporting walls covered with barrel vaults, still serve their purpose to this day.

Classification as bridge substruction 
Although the Pergamon Bridge is, due to its extraordinary width, often misleadingly called a tunnel, it should rather be treated as a bridge substruction, since the entire structure was erected above ground, which necessitates construction techniques more akin to bridge building and very different from those employed in tunnel-driving.

For urban development, such substructions are regarded as particularly useful for providing large open spaces in densely populated inner city areas. This was also the case in Pergamon, as the building of the Serapis Temple required the bridging of an entire section of the River Selinus in order to create sufficient space for a large platform in front of the temple.

Vault structure 
The bridge substruction features two parallel and linear barrel vaults which are separated by a continuously running partition wall. While the uphill entrances of the double tube are on the same level, the exits on the down-valley side are spaced at a  interval, leading to a significant difference in length between the western and the eastern branch.

The dimensions of both semi-circular arches are practically identical: the clear spans are  each, the rise from the springing line to the apex of the arch  and the clearance to ground level measures . The vaults are built of rubble bound with mortar, and rest on an ashlar stone base.

Up- and downstream of the bridge substruction are another two well-preserved ancient bridges across the Selinus, called Tabak Köprüsü and Üc Kemer Köprüsü ("Three Arch Bridge").

Discharge capacity 
The capacity limit of the Pergamon Bridge in case of floods has been the subject of hydraulic and hydrological research. The gradient of the tunnel was calculated as 0.6% with a maximum discharge capacity of 360 m³/s. Exceeding this limit puts the bridge under internal pressure and damages the structure in the process.

250 years (Günerman method)
550 years (D.S.I. method)
1,100 years (Mockus method)
8,500 years (Snyder method)

The study came to the conclusion that statistically every 700 years, a value which has been referred to as the "arithmetic mean", floods are to be expected which would exceed the capacity of the bridge.

See also 
 List of Roman bridges
 Roman architecture
 Roman engineering

Notes

Sources

Further reading

External links 

Roman bridges in Turkey
Deck arch bridges
Stone bridges in Turkey
Pergamon
Bergama
Tunnels in Turkey
Buildings and structures in İzmir Province
Arch bridges in Turkey